The 1927 Oklahoma Sooners football team represented the University of Oklahoma in the 1927 college football season. In their first year under head coach Adrian Lindsey, the Sooners compiled a 3–3–2 record (2–3 against conference opponents), finished in seventh place in the Missouri Valley Conference, and outscored their opponents by a combined total of 117 to 101.

Tackle Granville Norris was recognized as an All-American, and end Roy LeCrone received all-conference honors.

Schedule

Roster

References

Oklahoma
Oklahoma Sooners football seasons
Oklahoma Sooners football